Oxmetidine (code name SKF 92994) is an H2 histamine receptor receptor antagonist.

References 

H2 receptor antagonists